Belevonis (Greek: Μπελεβώνης) is a Greek surname that may refer to the following notable people:
Christos Belevonis (born 2002), Greek football forward 
Makis Belevonis (born 1975), Greek football right back
Stathis Belevonis (born 1998), Greek football defender 

Greek-language surnames